Delphyne Peretto (born February 9, 1982 in Albertville, Savoie) is a former French biathlete. She was on the bronze-winning relay team in the 2006 Winter Olympics.

Peretto retired at the end of the 2007-08 season.

External links 
 
 

1982 births
Living people
Sportspeople from Albertville
Biathletes at the 2006 Winter Olympics
Olympic biathletes of France
French female biathletes
Olympic bronze medalists for France
Olympic medalists in biathlon
Biathlon World Championships medalists
Medalists at the 2006 Winter Olympics
21st-century French women